Robert H. Whealey is an American historian with expertise on the Spanish Civil War and how it was influenced by Hitler. He is Professor Emeritus of Ohio University He also wrote for the History News Service.

Whealey's daughter, Alice Whealey, is author of the book, Josephus on Jesus: The Testimonium Flavianum Controversy from Late Antiquity to Modern Times.

He lives in Athens, Ohio.

References

21st-century American historians
21st-century American male writers
Living people
Ohio University faculty
Year of birth missing (living people)
American male non-fiction writers